Pauline Chasselin (born 1 August 1997) is a French table tennis player. Her highest career ITTF ranking was 106.

References

1997 births
Living people
French female table tennis players